Lior Samuel Pachter is a computational biologist. He works at the California Institute of Technology, where he is the Bren Professor of Computational Biology. He has widely varied research interests including genomics, combinatorics, computational geometry, machine learning, scientific computing, and statistics.

Early life and education
Pachter was born in Israel and grew up in South Africa.
He earned a bachelor's degree in mathematics from the California Institute of Technology in 1994. He completed his doctorate in mathematics from the Massachusetts Institute of Technology in 1999, supervised by Bonnie Berger, with Eric Lander and Daniel Kleitman as co-advisors.

Career and research
Pachter was with the University of California, Berkeley faculty from 1999 to 2018 and was given the Sackler Chair in 2012.

As well as for his technical contributions, Pachter is known for using new media to promote open science and for a thought experiment he posted on his blog according to which 'the nearest neighbor to the "perfect human"' is from Puerto Rico.  This received considerable media attention, and a response was published in Scientific American.

Awards and honors
In 2017, Pachter was elected a Fellow of the International Society for Computational Biology (ISCB).

See also
TopHat (bioinformatics)
Fast statistical alignment

References

External links

Living people
21st-century American biologists
20th-century American mathematicians
21st-century American mathematicians
Israeli biologists
Israeli mathematicians
Israeli computer scientists
South African biologists
South African mathematicians
South African computer scientists
California Institute of Technology alumni
University of California, Berkeley faculty
Combinatorialists
Researchers in geometric algorithms
1973 births
American bioinformaticians
Fellows of the International Society for Computational Biology